Sayyidat al-Nouriyyeh is a church in Beirut, Lebanon.

History
An old shrine dedicated to the Virgin Mary was in a room on the ground floor of a building in Souk al-Nouriyyeh, to the east of the Saint George Orthodox Cathedral. A vaulted entrance led to the shrine by way of a tiny intervening room. Sayyidat al-Nouriyyeh (Our Lady of Light) was believed to be a light that guided sailors and fishermen to safety. The shrine was  adorned with three icons: one of Christ, one of all the saints, and one of the Virgin Mary, reputed to be miraculous. Sayyidat al-Nouriyyeh was widely visited by both Christian and Muslim inhabitants of Beirut.  During the 1975-1990 Lebanese Civil War the shrine was burnt, looted and later completely destroyed, replaced in 2003 by the existing chapel.

External links 
 Description by Builders Design Consultants

Buildings and structures in Beirut
Churches in Beirut
Monuments and memorials in Lebanon
Tourist attractions in Beirut